Ponta de Pedras is a Brazilian municipality located in the state of Pará. Its population as of 2020 is estimated to be 31,549 people. The area of the municipality is 3,365.126 km². The city belongs to the mesoregion Marajó and to the microregion of Arari.

The municipality is contained in the  Marajó Archipelago Environmental Protection Area, a sustainable use conservation unit established in 1989 to protect the environment of the delta region.

References

Municipalities in Pará